:PAPERCUTZ (stylized as :papercutz or :PAPERCUTZ) is a Portuguese electronic music act formed as a side project in Porto that became a fully active band in 2008. Bruno Miguel is the only official member of Papercutz and solely responsible for its musical direction. After recordings, Bruno assembles a live band to perform with him which may include musicians used on studio recordings. Past musicians have included vocalists Melissa Veras, a US singer with Portuguese ascendancy born in New York and Portuguese Marisa Pinto, Marcela Freitas as well as instrumentalists Bruno Ribeiro, Tiago Morgado and Francisco Bernardo, among others.

Annie Nightingale described them as 'interesting and making an original sound' as one of the juries on the UK The People's Music Awards in 2009 where the group performed live and won the off the beaten track category. The same year the debut album Lylac was released on Canadian independent record label Apegenine recordings whose artist roster featured artists such as Montreal's own David Kristian or Khonnor and the single Ultravioleta rmx's included remixes by Riz Maslen (aka Neotropic) and the first ever release by now known The Sight Below just before his signing to Ghostly International. The album was well received by the press and music community and featured in such publications as Textura, Cuemix-magazine, Tokafi, Cylic Defrost, Subba-cultcha Organ Mag with Record Collector comparing Bruno's precision work to that of Four Tet.

The group toured in 2009 and 2010 promoting their debut album throughout Europe and U.S. with showcases on festivals such as SXSW and Exit Festival and signed to UK Audiobulb Records a new remix album Do outro lado do espelho (Lylac ambient reworks) spawned out of Lylac'''s textures with Drowned in Sound calling the album 'notably coherent and engaging' unlike other remix records featuring relevant ambient music artists like Taylor Deupree, Keith Kenniff, ex-member of UK 'shoegaze' icons Slowdive and Lowgold drummer Simon Scott among many others that Bruno personally invited to work on his music.

By end of 2011 news, came out that the band was working on a new still untitled album. Their new songs made an early debut at the 2012 edition of South by Southwest where it was noted the band had been working with producer Chris Coady in New York City. and were showcasing their new single "Rivers" which presented the band in a beat-heavy, darkened version of their left field dream pop. The album The Blur Between Us was released on 10 July 2012 and sees the band growing music wise with a push toward more eclectic sounds and personally with Miguel writing and dealing lyrically with feelings of loss for the first time in his adult years.

Early 2013, Miguel was selected as a participant Red Bull Music Academy with colleagues Evian Christ, Objekt, Koreless, Suzanne Kraft, Throwing Snow (from Snow Ghosts), Sinjin Hawke, Octa Octa, among others, which brought him back to New York City where the band played new shows and took a couple of months of to record new material for an upcoming EP with big expectation from the likes of MTV Iggy.

By that time Miguel is a requested producer with guest remixes for Morgan Kibby of M83, JMSN, Lucretia Dalt, Nite Jewel's Heart Shaped project, Castratii with vocalist Liela Moss of The Duke Spirit, among others. 

The band had an hiatus so Bruno could pursue other musical endeavours such as movie scoring and news of a comeback appeared by fall of 2016. In October 2016 they were confirmed to play at the 31st edition of Eurosonic Noorderslag in Groningen, Netherlands. In 2017 the band released a new well received song  and started touring playing shows and festivals through 2018 to 2019 with dates in the U.S. Europe, Iceland and Japan in early 2020 having announced the upcoming release of their new full-length album 'King Ruiner'.

Selected discography

 Ultravioleta rmx's (2008) Apegenine recordings
 Lylac (2008) Apegenine recordings
 Do outro lado do espelho (Lylac ambient reworks) (2010) Audiobulb Records 
 The Blur Between Us (2012) Sounds of a Playground/Rastilho Records
 The Blur Between Us (Extended Japanese Edition) (2013) Kilk Records
 Trust / Surrender - Sounds Of A Playground (2016)
 King Ruiner (2020) MOORWORKS
 King Ruiner'' (Extended Japanese Edition) (2020) Kilk Records

Videos
 Rivers MTV Iggy (2013)
 Where Beasts Die IMVDb (2013)
 Lylac (Helios remix) MTV (2010)

Awards

|-
|rowspan="2"| 2009 || :papercutz || TPMA "Off the beaten track" category  || 
|-
| :papercutz || Vodafone/Myspace Portugal The Ones to Watch || 
|-
|| 2010 || "A secret search" || International Songwriting Competition (Dance/Electronica) || 
|-

References

External links

 :PAPERCUTZ site (official site)

Portuguese electronic music groups
Musical groups from Porto